Kac Wawa is a 2012 Polish comedy film directed by Łukasz Karwowski. It tells the story of a group of men, one of whom is getting married, and therefore the others throw a buck's party for him.

Plot 
Andrzej is getting married and, on the night before his wedding, he and his friends (Karol, Jarek, Tomek, and Jerzy) meet up in order to play Macao, whereas his  
fiancé Marta is having her bachelorette party. As she gets more and more drunk and starts wandering across Warsaw, Andrzej and the others are trying to find some prostitutes to keep them company for the rest of the night.

Cast 
 Borys Szyc as Andrzej
 Michał Żurawski as Tomasz
 Mariusz Pujszo as Jerzy
 Antoni Pawlicki as Jarek
 Michał Milowicz as Karol
 Sonia Bohosiewicz as Marta
 Aleksandra Nieśpielak as Gocha
 Tomasz Karolak as Silvio
 Przemysław Bluszcz as "Kobyła"
 Mirosław Zbrojewicz as "Kaban"
 Anna Prus as Klaudia
 Roma Gąsiorowska as Sandra

Reception
Some theaters removed the film from the repertoire. A worker of one of those cinemas explained: "We withdrew Kac Wawa because we couldn't sell the tickets. People would leave the cinema while the movie was being shown. After that only one or two people would turn up. We figured we couldn't afford to keep this movie in the repertoire."

Polish critic Tomasz Raczek wrote in his review:

Producer Jacek Samojłowicz sued Raczek, saying that "according to [his] lawyers, [Raczek] has exceeded the limits of film criticism and breached journalistic ethics, perhaps for personal reasons."

The film's screenwriter, Piotr Czaja, confronted Raczek, accusing him of having failed to understand the message of Kac Wawa. Czaja also stated that he had been given the impression that the viewers liked the film and laughed a lot.

On his Facebook profile, Szyc wrote: "Critics are one-legged theorists of the broad jump. It's easiest to just criticize; especially we Poles love it."

References

External links 

2012 films
2012 comedy films
2010s Polish-language films
Polish comedy films